John Edmund Gardner (20 November 1926 – 3 August 2007) was an English spy and thriller novelist, best known for his James Bond continuation novels, but also for his series of Boysie Oakes books and three continuation novels containing Sir Arthur Conan Doyle's fictional villain, Professor Moriarty.

Gardner, an ex-Royal Marine commando, was for a period an Anglican priest, but he lost his faith and left the church after a short time. After recovering from alcohol addiction, he wrote his first book, the autobiographical Spin the Bottle published in 1964.

Gardner wrote over 50 works of fiction, including 14 original James Bond novels, and the novel versions of two Bond films. He died from suspected heart failure on 3 August 2007.

Early life
John Edmund Gardner was born on 20 November 1926 in Seaton Delaval, a village in Northumberland. His parents were Cyril Gardner, a London-born Anglican priest who had been ordained in Wallsend in 1921, and Lena Henderson, a local girl; the couple were married in 1925. In 1933 the family moved to the market town of Wantage in what was then Berkshire, where Cyril took up the position of Chaplain at St Mary's, Wantage, and Gardner was educated at the local King Alfred's School.

During the Second World War he joined the Home Guard, despite being only 13 at the time. Gardner subsequently served in the Royal Navy Fleet Air Arm, before transferring to the Royal Marines 42 Commando for service in the Middle and Far East. Gardner considered himself "the worst commando in the world" and, despite being "a small-arms expert ... [who] also knew a lot about explosives", he admitted that he "bent an aeroplane I was learning to fly".

After the war he went up to St John's College, Cambridge, to study theology and was subsequently ordained as an Anglican priest in 1953. He realised that he had lost his faith and made an error in his career; he later admitted that during one sermon, "I didn't believe a word I was saying". He was released from the church in 1958 and took up a position as a drama critic with the Stratford-upon-Avon Herald. It was whilst at the Herald at age 33 that Gardner realised he was an alcoholic, drinking two bottles of gin a day. He overcame his addiction and produced his first book as part of his therapy: the autobiographical Spin the Bottle, published in 1964. Critic and scholar John Sutherland says that of all the books Gardner published, it was "the one that most deserves to survive."

Writing career
In 1964, Gardner began his novelist career with The Liquidator, in which he created the character Boysie Oakes who inadvertently is mistaken to be a tough, pitiless man of action and is thereupon recruited into a British spy agency. In fact, Oakes was a devout coward who was terrified of violence, suffered from airsickness and was afraid of heights and Gardner admitted of him that, "though I have denied it many times—he was of course a complete piss-take of J. Bond". The book appeared at the height of the fictional spy mania and, as a send-up of the whole business, was an immediate success. Upon reviewing the novel in The New York Times, Anthony Boucher wrote, "Mr. Gardner succeeds in having it both ways: He has written a clever parody which is also a genuinely satisfactory thriller." The book was made into a film of the same name by MGM and another seven light-hearted novels and four short stories about the cowardly Oakes appeared over the next eleven years.

Following the success of his Oakes books, Gardner created new characters: Derek Torry—a Scotland Yard inspector of Italian descent—and Herbie Kruger, the latter of which appeared in a series of novels published simultaneously with his Bond works. In the mid-1970s Gardner also wrote the first of three novels using the character of Professor Moriarty from the Sherlock Holmes series, the last of which was published posthumously. The third of this series, titled simply Moriarty, was delayed due to a dispute with the publisher, but was finally released shortly after his death. Erik Lee Preminger bought the film rights to the first of the trilogy - The Return of Moriarty - and wrote a script. Edgar Bronfman Jr., for Sagittarius Entertainment and Nat Cohen, for EMI Productions were to produce. Donald Sutherland was to portray Moriarty. Funding however fell through shortly before filming was to begin.

In 1979, Glidrose Publications (now Ian Fleming Publications) approached Gardner and asked him to revive Ian Fleming's James Bond series of novels. Between 1981 and 1996, Gardner wrote fourteen James Bond novels, and the novelizations of two Bond films. Gardner stated that he wanted "to bring Mr Bond into the 1980s", although he retained the ages of the characters as they were when Fleming had left them. Even though Gardner kept the ages the same, he made Bond grey at the temples as a nod to the passing of the years. With the influence of the American publishers, Putnam's, the Gardner novels showed an increase in the number of Americanisms used in the book, such as a waiter wearing "pants", rather than trousers, in The Man from Barbarossa. James Harker, writing in The Guardian, considered that the Gardner books were "dogged by silliness", giving examples of Scorpius, where much of the action is set in Chippenham, and Win, Lose or Die, where "Bond gets chummy with an unconvincing Maggie Thatcher". Whilst Gardner's Bond novels received a mixed reaction from the critics, they were popular and a number appeared in The New York Times Best Seller list, bringing the author commercial success.

Gardner had an ambivalent view on being the Bond author, once saying: "I'm very grateful to have been selected to keep Bond alive. But I'd much rather be remembered for my own work than I would for Bond", while saying on another occasion that: "I remain proud that my contribution to the Bond saga played a great part in its development". In the mid-1990s, after discovering he had oesophageal cancer, Gardner officially retired from writing Bond novels and Glidrose Publications quickly chose Raymond Benson to continue the literary stories of James Bond.

His break from writing lasted for five years, following the death of his wife, but after battling his illness he returned to print in 2000 with a new novel, Day of Absolution. Gardner also began a series of books with a new character, Suzie Mountford, a 1930s police detective.

The Globe and Mail crime critic Derrick Murdoch said, "John Gardner is technically a highly competent thriller novelist who never seems to be quite at ease unless he is writing in the same vein as another writer. (He has worked John le Carré and Graham Greene this way, and it's what makes him so well qualified to continue the James Bond saga.)"

The Crime Writers' Association short-listed The Liquidator, The Dancing Dodo, The Nostradamus Traitor, and The Garden of Weapons for their annual Gold Dagger award.

Personal life
In 1952 Gardner married Margaret Mercer and the couple had two children, Simon and Alexis. Gardner also had another daughter, Miranda, the result of a long affair with Susan Wright, a former personal assistant to Peter Sellers. In 1989, Gardner and his family moved to the United States and it was in America that he was diagnosed with cancer; firstly of the prostate and then, six years later, of the oesophagus. The subsequent medical treatment in the US left him near bankrupt and he returned to the UK in November 1996. Shortly after his return, in February 1997, Margaret died unexpectedly.

When Gardner returned to writing, his second book, Bottled Spider, introduced a new character, Detective Sergeant Suzie Mountford. Gardner took the surname from Patricia Mountford, an ex-girlfriend to whom he had been engaged in 1949. When she read the book Mountford contacted Gardner through his publishers and the two were subsequently engaged.

Death
Gardner died on Friday 3 August 2007 from suspected heart failure. He collapsed while shopping in Basingstoke; he was later casually driven to hospital, where he died.

Works

Autobiography
Spin the Bottle (1964)

Boysie Oakes novels
The Liquidator (1964)
Understrike (1965)
Amber Nine (1966)
Madrigal (1967)
Founder Member (1969)
Traitor's Exit (1970)
The Airline Pirates (1970) - published in the US as Air Apparent
A Killer for a Song (1975)
Two Boysie Oakes short stories appear in Hideaway (1968) (A Handful of Rice, Corkscrew).

Two Boysie Oakes short stories appear in The Assassination File (1974) (Boysie Oakes and The Explosive Device, Sunset at Paleokastritsa).

Derek Torry novels
A Complete State of Death (1969) - reissued in the US as The Stone Killer
The Corner Men (1974)

Professor Moriarty novels
The Return of Moriarty (1974)
The Revenge of Moriarty (1975)
Moriarty (2008)

Herbie Kruger novels
The Nostradamus Traitor (1979)
The Garden of Weapons (1980)
The Quiet Dogs (1982)
Maestro (1993)
Confessor (1995)
Herbie Kruger also appears in The Secret Houses and The Secret Families.

The Railton family novels
The Secret Generations (1985)
The Secret Houses (1988)
The Secret Families (1989)

James Bond novels
Licence Renewed (1981)
For Special Services (1982)
Icebreaker (1983)
Role of Honour (1984)
Nobody Lives for Ever (1986)
No Deals, Mr. Bond (1987)
Scorpius (1988)
Win, Lose or Die (1989)
Licence to Kill (1989) – novelization of a film script
Brokenclaw (1990)
The Man from Barbarossa (1991)
Death is Forever (1992)
Never Send Flowers (1993)
SeaFire (1994)
GoldenEye (1995) – novelization of a film script
Cold (1996) – published in the US as Cold Fall

Detective Sergeant Suzie Mountford novels
Bottled Spider (2002)
The Streets of Town (2003)
Angels Dining at the Ritz (2004)
Troubled Midnight (2005)
No Human Enemy (2007)

Other novels
The Censor (1970)
Every Night's a Bullfight (1971) (Published in the US in a bowdlerized edition as Every Night's a Festival in 1972.)
To Run a Little Faster (1976)
The Werewolf Trace (1977)
The Dancing Dodo (1978)
Golgotha (1980) - (Published in the US as The Last Trump)
The Director (1982) (A re-working of his 1971 novel Every Night's a Bullfight.)
Flamingo (1983)
Blood of the Fathers (1992) (as by "Edmund McCoy". Later published under his own name in 2004.)
Day of Absolution (2001)

Short story collections
Hideaway (1968) (Contains two Boysie Oakes stories.)
The Assassination File (1974) (Contains two Boysie Oakes stories.)

References

Bibliography

External links 

John-Gardner.com

1926 births
2007 deaths
Alumni of St John's College, Cambridge
British spy fiction writers
Royal Marines personnel of World War II
Royal Marines Commando officers
English thriller writers
People from Seaton Delaval
Writers from Northumberland
Postmodern writers
20th-century British novelists
21st-century British novelists
English male novelists
British Home Guard soldiers
20th-century English male writers
21st-century English male writers
Fleet Air Arm personnel of World War II
Child soldiers in World War II